

List of Ambassadors

Simona Halperin (Non-Resident, Singapore) 2018 -

References

See also
East Timor–Israel relations

East Timor
Israel